Mouhamadou Drammeh (born 15 May 1999) is a French footballer who plays as midfielder for Danish club Vejle Boldklub.

Career
Drammeh debuted with Reims in a 3-1 Ligue 1 loss to FC Lorient on 17 October 2020.

Personal life
Born in France, Drammeh is of Gambian descent.

References

External links
 
 FFF Profile

1999 births
Living people
Footballers from Paris
French footballers
French expatriate footballers
French sportspeople of Gambian descent
Black French sportspeople
Association football midfielders
Stade de Reims players
Vejle Boldklub players
Ligue 1 players
Championnat National 2 players
French expatriate sportspeople in Denmark
Expatriate men's footballers in Denmark